The 2013 Western Athletic Conference men's soccer season is the fifth season of men's varsity soccer in the conference, and the first since 1999. The conference first sponsored the sport in 1996, but after eight schools split from the WAC in 1999 to form the Mountain West Conference (MW), the WAC only played the 1999 season before disbanding its men's soccer league.

The current WAC men's soccer conference is essentially a reboot of the Mountain Pacific Sports Federation (MPSF) men's soccer league. Six of the eight teams that relaunched WAC men's soccer were MPSF members in the 2012 season, with Grand Canyon (moving from NCAA Division II) and UMKC (joining the WAC from The Summit League) the only exceptions. Two of these schools, Air Force and UNLV, were charter members of the WAC soccer conference in 1996 before leaving to form the MW.

After a near-complete turnover in the league membership between 2011 and 2013, the WAC was forced to drop football as a sponsored sport. This left the conference with only two sponsored men's team sports; under NCAA rules, Division I conferences are required to sponsor at least three team sports for each sex. In January 2013, the WAC announced it would add men's soccer to bring itself in compliance with this rule. At that time, three of the confirmed full WAC members for the 2013–14 school year—Grand Canyon and former MPSF men's soccer members CSU Bakersfield and Seattle—sponsored the sport. The WAC filled out its men's soccer membership by inviting the four remaining MPSF teams (Denver and New Mexico had already announced plans to leave the MPSF, respectively for The Summit League and Conference USA). After the January announcement, the WAC picked up an eighth men's soccer member when UMKC announced it would become a full member of the conference in 2013–14.

The Air Force Falcons, who were previously a MPSF member, entered the season as the defending MPSF champions.

Current members 

 Air Force
 CSU Bakersfield
 Grand Canyon
 Houston Baptist 
 San Jose State
 Seattle
 UMKC
 UNLV

Season outlook

Teams

Stadia and locations 

 Chicago State, Utah Valley, and UTPA do not currently sponsor men's soccer. The first two of these schools will add the sport for the 2014–15 school year; UTPA will do the same a year later. Idaho (which will leave for the Big Sky Conference in July 2014) and New Mexico State do not sponsor the sport, and have no known plans to do so.

Standings

WAC Tournament 

The format for the 2013 WAC Men's Soccer Tournament will be announced in the Fall of 2013.

Results

Statistics

References 

 
2013 NCAA Division I men's soccer season